Ocran is a surname. Notable people with the surname include:

A. K. Ocran, Ghanaian military personnel
Albert Kwesi Ocran (1929–2019), Ghanaian soldier and politician
Comfort Ocran, Ghanaian motivational speaker and author
Emmanuel Ocran (born 1996), Ghanaian footballer
Lee Ocran (died 2019), Ghanaian politician 
Richard Ocran (born 1993), Ghanaian footballer
Samuel Ocran (born 1986), Ghanaian footballer
Tawia Modibo Ocran (1942–2008), Ghanaian academic and judge
Wilberforce Ocran (born 1999), British footballer